Chlorolestes draconicus, the Drakensberg malachite, is a species of damselfly in the family Synlestidae.

Distribution and status

This species has a restricted range in the Drakensberg mountains of Lesotho and South Africa. Its conservation status has been assessed as Least Concern as much of its range falls within the uKhahlamba / Drakensberg Park.

Habitat
Its natural habitat is rocky streams at high altitude (1700–3000 m).

Identification
Where Chlorolestes draconicus is found, it is usually outnumbered by the similar Chlorolestes fasciatus. Key differences between these species are the shape of the antehumeral stripe and the shape of the appendages. Chlorolestes draconicus is also larger and darker than Chlorolestes fasciatus.

References

External links

 Chlorolestes draconicus  on African Dragonflies and Damselflies Online
 Chlorolestes draconicus  description on Global Biodiversity Information Facility GBIF

Odonata of Africa
Insects of South Africa
Synlestidae
Insects described in 1956
Taxa named by Boris Balinsky
Taxonomy articles created by Polbot